John Beresford Power (20 November 1930 – February 2016) was an Australian film and television director, who began his career as a journalist.

Early life and journalism career
Power was born in Maitland, New South Wales. His older brother was Dave Power, a long-distance runner who won medals at the Olympics and Commonwealth Games. After leaving school, he joined the Maitland Mercury as a cadet journalist, later moving to Sydney to work for The Daily Telegraph and The Daily Mirror. He was a political journalist in Canberra at the time of the Australian Labor Party split of 1955, events which he would later cover in the documentary film Like a Summer Storm.

Awards
Power won the AFI Award for Best Direction for the 1974 TV docudrama Billy and Percy.

Select filmography
The Other Side of Innocence  (1972) (documentary) - director
Like a Summer Storm (1972) (TV movie) - director, writer, producer
What did you do at school today? (1974) (documentary short) - director
Escape from Singapore (1974) (TV movie) - director, writer, producer
Billy and Percy (1974) (TV movie) - director, writer, producer
They Don't Clap Losers (1975) (TV movie) - director, writer, producer
The Picture Show Man (1977) - director
The Sound of Love (1978) (TV movie) - director, writer
A Single Life (1986) (TV movie)
The Dismissal (1983) (TV miniseries) - director
The Great Gold Swindle (1984) - director
Special Squad (1984) (TV Series) - director
Return to Eden (1986) (TV series) - director
A Single Life (1986) - director, writer
Alice to Nowhere (1986) (TV miniseries) - director
Willing and Abel (1987) (TV series) - director
Mike Willesee's Australians (1988) (TV series) - director episode "Clyde Fenton"
The Dirtwater Dynasty (1988) (TV miniseries) - director
Tanamera - Lion of Singapore (1989) (TV miniseries) - director
Father (1990) - director
Sky Trackers (1990) (TV movie) - director
All the Rivers Run 2 (1990) (TV miniseries) - director
Charles and Diana: Unhappily Ever After (1992) (TV movie) - director
The Tommyknockers (1993) (TV miniseries) - director
Someone Else's Child (1994) (TV movie) - director
Betrayed by Love (1994) (TV movie) - director
Fatal Vows: The Alexandra O'Hara Story (1994) (TV movie) - director
A Child is Missing (1995) (TV movie) - director
Heart of Fire (1997) (TV movie) - director
Goldrush: A Real Life Alaskan Adventure (1998) (TV movie) - director

References

External links

1930 births
2016 deaths
Australian film directors
Australian journalists
Australian television directors
Australian war correspondents
Logie Award winners